Folkestone Academy is a mixed secondary school and sixth form with academy status in Folkestone, Kent, England that was established in September 2007. In April 2017, the school became a part of Turner Schools

History 
The £40m purpose-built academy opened in 2007 and replaced the town's Channel School. In October 2013 a sixth form centre was built at The Glassworks, in Folkestone's Creative Quarter close to the town centre.

It was originally established as an all-through school educating pupils from the age of 4. However the primary department of the school was formally split from Folkestone Academy in September 2020 to become Folkestone Primary.

References

External links 
 

Educational institutions established in 2007
Secondary schools in Kent
Academies in Kent
Folkestone
2007 establishments in England